"Rockin' Robin" (originally released as "Rock-In Robin" on the Class Records 45 single) is a song written by Leon René under the pseudonym Jimmie Thomas, and recorded by Bobby Day in 1958. It was Day's biggest hit single, becoming a number two hit on the Billboard Hot 100, and spent one week at the top of the R&B sales chart. Michael Jackson recorded his own version of the song in 1972, which also achieved success.

Personnel
Bobby Day – vocals
Plas Johnson – piccolo
Earl Palmer – drums
Barney Kessel – guitar

Copyright status
"Rockin' Robin" is in the public domain, as the owners never renewed the copyright.

Charts

Michael Jackson version

In 1972, Michael Jackson released his own version of "Rockin' Robin", which was released as a single from his gold-certified solo album titled Got to Be There as a follow-up single to the song of the same name. It was the biggest hit from the album, hitting number 1 on the Cash Box singles chart and peaking at number two on both the Billboard Hot 100, behind "The First Time Ever I Saw Your Face" by Roberta Flack, and the Billboard soul singles chart, behind "In the Rain" by the Dramatics.

Track listing
A. "Rockin' Robin" – 2:30
B. "Love Is Here and Now You're Gone" – 2:51

Chart performance

Certifications

See also
List of 1950s one-hit wonders in the United States

References

1958 songs
1958 singles
1972 singles
Songs written by Leon René
Motown singles
Michael Jackson songs
Cashbox number-one singles
Songs about birds
Songs about fictional male characters
Public domain music